The Jiangsu High People's Court, officially called High People's Court of Nanjing Province, is the high people's court, the highest judicial organ, of Jiangsu, China.  It is located in Nanjing.  The current president is Gong Pixiang.

External links
 Introduction to Jiangsu High People's Court at the Official Website of Jiangsu courts

Judiciary of China
Buildings and structures in Nanjing
Courts in Asia
Organizations based in Nanjing